Errol McFarlane Jr. (born October 12, 1977) is a Trinidadian former footballer who played as a forward.

Club career

Youth and College
Born in Port of Spain, McFarlane attended Trinity College in his native Trinidad, and briefly attended Malick Secondary Comprehensive, before moving to the United States in 1995 to attend Nassau Community College. He transferred to Hofstra University in his sophomore year, and subsequently spent the next three years playing college soccer for the Pride.

Professional
McFarlane turned professional in 1999 with Defence Force in the TT Pro League, winning the inaugural league title in his first season. He won a second T&T PFL Championship winner's medal with San Juan Jabloteh in 2002 before signing with Al-Nejmeh in the Lebanese Professional League, where he quickly became one of the leading marksmen in that country. He finished the 2003/2004 season with 15 goals, helping the club to the league title and a place in the 2004 AFC Cup.

McFarlane has also played professionally in Iceland, for Fylkir and Breiðablik. After another brief stint in Lebanon with Al-Mabarrah and back home in Trinidad with St. Ann's Rangers, McFarlane signed a two-year deal with the Rochester Rhinos of the USL First Division on July 23, 2009, but was let go after scoring only 2 goals in 12 appearances.

International career
McFarlane has made 38 appearances for the senior Trinidad and Tobago national football team. He was part of the qualifying team in the 2006 FIFA World Cup, but was not selected in the final squad due to a late hamstring injury.

Personal life
Errol is the brother of fellow professional Shem McFarlane, who plays for his former club St. Ann's Rangers.

Honours
Individual
 Lebanese Premier League Team of the Season: 2000–01

References

External links
 Rochester Rhinos bio
 Soca Warriors profile
 

1977 births
Living people
Trinidad and Tobago expatriate footballers
Trinidad and Tobago footballers
Trinidad and Tobago international footballers
Expatriate footballers in Iceland
Expatriate footballers in Lebanon
Trinidad and Tobago expatriate sportspeople in Lebanon
2007 CONCACAF Gold Cup players
USL First Division players
Rochester New York FC players
Nejmeh SC players
TT Pro League players
Lebanese Premier League players
Nassau Community College alumni
Hofstra Pride men's soccer players
Association football forwards
Al Mabarra Club players
Lebanese Premier League top scorers